Jean-Pierre Frantzen (9 May 1890 – 23 November 1957) was a Luxembourgian gymnast who competed in the 1912 Summer Olympics. He was born in Luxembourg City. In 1912 he was a member of the Luxembourgian team which finished fifth in the team, free system event.

References

External links
 profile

1890 births
1957 deaths
Sportspeople from Luxembourg City
Luxembourgian male artistic gymnasts
Olympic gymnasts of Luxembourg
Gymnasts at the 1912 Summer Olympics
20th-century Luxembourgian people